In macroeconomics, the Keynes–Ramsey rule is a necessary condition for the optimality of intertemporal consumption choice. Usually it is expressed as a differential equation relating the rate of change of consumption with interest rates, time preference, and (intertemporal) elasticity of substitution. If derived from a basic Ramsey–Cass–Koopmans model, the Keynes–Ramsey rule may look like

The Keynes–Ramsey rule is named after Frank P. Ramsey, who derived it in 1928, and his mentor John Maynard Keynes, who provided an economic interpretation.

Mathematically, the Keynes–Ramsey rule is a necessary first-order condition for an optimal control problem, also known as an Euler–Lagrange equation.

See also 
 Ramsey–Cass–Koopmans model

References

Further reading 
 

Economic growth
Intertemporal economics
Mathematical optimization